Dimitris Deligiannis (born 9 October 1972) is a retired Greek football midfielder.

References

1972 births
Living people
Greek footballers
Pierikos F.C. players
Ionikos F.C. players
Apollon Pontou FC players
Super League Greece players
Association football midfielders